Daniele Ciceri (born ?) is a former Italian sport shooter who won two medals at individual senior level at the European Championships.

Biography
Together with his brother Alessandro, also a multi-medal shooter at the international shooting competition, also at the Olympic level, he was the owner of the famous Italian tool company Beta, sponsor in the 70s of the March of the Milanese driver Vittorio Brambilla in Formula One.

Achievements

See also
Trap European Champions

References

External links
 

Date of birth missing (living people)
Living people
Trap and double trap shooters
Italian male sport shooters
Year of birth missing (living people)